Wakamaeda Eiichirō (born Hideo Yui; 24 November 1930 – 3 June 2007) was a sumo wrestler from Nishibiwajima, Aichi, Japan. Making his professional debut in January 1950, he reached the top makuuchi division in May 1954. His highest rank was sekiwake. He won four special prizes and three gold stars for defeating yokozuna. He retired in January 1964 and became an elder of the Japan Sumo Association under the name of Onoe.

Career
Born in Nishikasugai District, Aichi, in the town of Nishibiwajima, he was spotted by scouts on a 1949 regional tour of Nagoya and joined Takasago stable in January 1950. Initially he fought under his own surname of Yui, but in 1952 changed his shikona to Wakamaeda, with the second kanji of Maeda taken from his stablemaster, the former yokozuna Maedayama. He reached the jūryō division in March 1953 and the top makuuchi division in May 1954. In his top division debut he was suffering from acute appendicitis from Day 9 but managed to stay in the tournament with pain-killing injections, and only withdrew on Day 13 once he had clinched a majority of wins against losses, or kachi-koshi.  In May 1955 he defeated  Yoshibayama in his first ever bout against a yokozuna, earning his first kinboshi, and he made his sanyaku debut at komusubi in January 1958, after a strong 11–4 record in the previous tournament. His komusubi debut was a memorable one as he defeated two yokozuna (Yoshibayama and Kagamisato) and was awarded the Fighting Sprit prize. Two 10–5 records in the next two tournaments, which included  wins over yokozuna Wakanohana and  Chiyonoyama, saw him move up to sekiwake and win two more Fighting Spirit prizes. However his quest for ōzeki promotion was ended when he scored only 5–10 in July 1958. He returned to komusubi in January 1959, defeating Tochinishiki and winning the Technique prize, and was promoted back to sekiwake for the March 1959 tournament, but narrowly failed to get a majority of wins. His 3–12 at komusubi in the following May 1959 tournament was his final appearance in the sanyaku ranks. He was to win two further kinboshi, both against Wakanohana, in November 1960 and January 1962. He was finally demoted from the top division in September 1963 after a poor 2–13 score. He had fought in makuuchi for 50 tournaments, with a win-loss record of 355–389, with 6 injury absences. He retired two tournaments later in January 1964.

Retirement
His danpatsu-shiki, or official retirement ceremony was held in July 1964 in the same hall as the Nagoya tournament that year, the Kanayama Gymnasium. He remained in sumo as a coach for a short time, under the elder name of Onoe. After leaving the Japan Sumo Association in September 1964 he ran a sumo restaurant in Nagoya. He died in June 2007 at the age of 76.

Career record

See also
Glossary of sumo terms
List of past sumo wrestlers
List of sekiwake

References

1930 births
2007 deaths
Japanese sumo wrestlers
Sumo people from Aichi Prefecture